The Simeon Monument, also known as the Soane Obelisk, the Soane Monument and the Simeon Obelisk, is a stone structure in Market Place, the former site of the market in Reading, Berkshire. It was commissioned by Edward Simeon, a Reading-born merchant who became extremely wealthy as a City of London trader. Edward Simeon's brother, John, was a former Member of Parliament for Reading who had lost his seat in the 1802 elections to the parliament of the newly created United Kingdom of Great Britain and Ireland, since which time the family had been engaged in ostentatious spending locally in an effort to gain support among the town's voters. 

Although street lighting had been installed in Reading in 1797, the system used was one of lamps attached to the sides of buildings and as a consequence open spaces remained unlit. In 1804 Simeon persuaded the Mayor of Reading that it would be of benefit to erect a structure in Market Place, which would serve both to carry lamps to light the area and to improve the flow of traffic in the area, and volunteered to pay for such a structure himself.

Simeon commissioned local architect John Soane to design a suitable structure. It had no official unveiling or opening ceremony, but the stonework was complete by September 1804. The structure was immediately controversial, denounced within weeks of its opening as "a paltry gew-gaw thing without use, or name", built by Simeon to promote himself rather than for the public benefit. In early 1805 Simeon donated an annuity of 3% interest on £1000 to pay for the lamps on the obelisk to be lit in perpetuity.

By 1900 a cabmen's shelter had been erected next to the monument, and in 1933 underground public toilets had been built alongside it. Although Simeon had stipulated that the lamps were to remain lighted forever, by this time the lamps were no longer operational, having been replaced by baskets of flowers in 1911. Although the monument was Grade II listed in 1956, by this time it was becoming extremely dilapidated. The market was relocated away from Market Place in the 1970s, and the obelisk avoided demolition primarily owing to lobbying by admirers of Soane, as it was the last surviving structure in Reading to have been designed by him. 

In 2005, Reading Borough Council agreed to landscape Market Place and to renovate the Simeon Monument. The now-disused toilets and other structures around the monument were removed, and the monument itself was restored to its former condition.

Background

The settlement has existed since at least the Anglo-Saxon period, it became a prominent town in 1121 following the foundation of Reading Abbey. Located on the Great West Road, the main route connecting London to Bath and Bristol, and with the Thames providing direct shipping routes to London and Oxford, the city grew prosperous and became a major industrial centre, particularly noted for its iron production and breweries, as well as a major market town for the surrounding area.

Market Place in Reading was a large triangular piece of open land, surrounded by shops, which since the twelfth century had been the site of Reading's market. The Borough Corporation maintained the area, in return for a tax of one pint of corn from each sack sold. While the outdoor market in Market Place had traditionally specialised in dairy produce, meat and poultry, the sale of these items had been moved to a nearby purpose-built market hall in 1800, leaving Market Place dealing with trade in grain, fruit, vegetables and "colonial or manufactured articles"; Reading was considered one of the cheapest places in the country to buy imported and manufactured items. By the early nineteenth century, around 200 wagons of produce would arrive in Reading on busy market days.

Although Reading had introduced street lighting in 1797, this system did not use lamp posts and instead consisted of oil lamps attached to the walls of buildings. As a consequence, open areas such as Market Place remained unlit other than around their edges.

John Soane

John Soane (from 1831 Sir John Soane) was a local architect, born in nearby Goring in 1753 and educated at William Baker's Academy in Reading. After a successful early career designing country houses, on 16 October 1788 he was appointed architect and surveyor to the Bank of England. In addition to his work for the Bank of England he continued to design other buildings, including in 1789 a brewery in Bridge Street, Reading, and in 1796 a house for Lancelot Austwick, who was to become Mayor of Reading in 1803.

Edward Simeon
Edward Simeon (1755–1812) was a Reading-born merchant, who became extremely wealthy as a City of London trader. From 1792 he was a director of the Bank of England. Although he lived in London, in Salvadore House on White Hart Court, he maintained links with Reading. His 1792 wedding took place there, and he regularly donated clothing to the poor children of the town. The Simeon family were prominent in the town; John Simeon, brother to Edward, was the Recorder of Reading and a Tory politician who had been elected MP for the town in the 1796 British general election, lost his seat in the 1802 election to the parliament of the newly created United Kingdom, and successfully regained the seat in the 1806 general election. John Simeon was a controversial and reactionary figure who opposed the poor being taught arithmetic or writing, and following his defeat in 1802 the Simeon family had been engaged in ostentatious efforts to curry favour with the approximately 300 men who were entitled to vote in Reading's elections.

Concerned about the appearance of the Market Place and the congestion caused by traffic passing through it, Simeon wrote to Lancelot Austwick, the Mayor of Reading, on 24 January 1804:

Austwick approved Simeon's plan, and John Soane was approached to design an obelisk with the dual purpose of acting as an obstruction to prevent wagons driving across Market Place, and holding four lamps to illuminate the area.

Design and construction
Soane's initial design was based on an unbuilt Palladian structure Soane had designed for Norwich Market, comprising a square base with Ionic columns supporting a cupola and four lamps on diagonally-set piers; the cupola would in turn be topped with a caduceus. He soon rejected this shape in favour of an unconventional triangular design. It is unrecorded why he made this choice; Sowan (2007) speculates that it may have been inspired by triangular Roman lamps Soane had seen on a recent visit to Pompeii, although it is more likely to be a response to the triangular shape of Market Place itself. His final design was a mixture of differing architectural styles, and consisted of a triangular base with each corner supporting a wrought iron lamp, surrounding a fluted three-sided Portland stone column, which in turn supported a stone cylinder topped with a bronze or copper pinecone.

In May 1804 the Borough Corporation approved Simeon and Soane's scheme, although the proposed metal pinecone was replaced with a pinecone in carved stone, and by 20 July Soane was in Reading supervising construction. Robert Spiller was paid £310 3/– (about £ in  terms) to build the structure. Bricklayer J Lovegrove built the brick core of the base, James Marshall was stonemason, and Thomas Russell the blacksmith. The base of the structure was adorned with a large metal plaque reading:

On the remaining two sides are bronze works, one consisting  of the arms of Simeon, the other showing a crowned head surrounded by four uncrowned heads.  The corner columns bear carved fasces.

Completion

There was no unveiling ceremony for the monument and the date its lamps were first lit is not recorded, but the stonework was complete by the time Soane inspected it on 3 September 1804. The first recorded mention of the completed monument comes in a report of a dinner hosted on 10 September 1804 by Reading's MP Charles Shaw-Lefevre, reporting that "Mr Monck was remarkably happy in his allusion to a certain newly erected monument, by observing that some gentlemen endeavoured to ingratiate themselves with the Electors by raising monuments of stone, and having their transitory names emblazoned on them in brass, but that his friend raised a more lasting monument, in the breasts and hearts of his constituents". The monument proved immediately controversial; a letter published in the Reading Mercury on 24 September accused Simeon of attempting to "bias the heads of the Borough in his favour by setting up in the market-place a paltry gew-gaw thing without use, or name", and stating that "Some denominate it an obelisk, others a pillar, but among the generality of the inhabitants it is called a p****** post", referring to its use as an object to urinate on. At this time the lamps were not yet in place, and it is possible that the anonymous critic (likely to have been local historian John Man) was not aware that the structure was intended as a lamp-post to illuminate the market, and thought that Simeon had erected the column as a monument to himself. The triangular base of the monument has shallow recesses on each side, the railings surrounding it had not yet been installed, and as the lamps were not yet operational these recesses would have offered a degree of privacy, so it is likely that the anonymous author was correct in asserting that at that time the structure was being used as an impromptu urinal.

During the planning and construction of the monument, Edward Simeon had commissioned what he described as "a variety of experiments ... to produce the most effectual and brilliant light". On 17 January 1805, with the monument now in place, he wrote to George Gilbertson, the Mayor of Reading, advising that:

The lamps themselves, along with their supports, were supplied by John Neville of Fleet Street in London. Neville died before being fully paid for the lamps and supports, and Simeon neglected to pay his heirs. On 18 August 1809, following Neville's death, his brother threatened to attach a second plaque to the structure reading "Edward Simeon Esq, of Salvadore House Accepted from William Neville of Fleet Street £20.9s.7d as a small donation towards the expense of erecting his obelisk in commemoration of his name for the work and expenses attending the same performed by his late brother John Neville 416 Strand London". In January 1810 Soane and Simeon each paid half of the outstanding sum to William Neville; Neville returned both cheques, requesting that Simeon donate his share of the sum to a local charity in Reading and that Soane keep his share to do with as he wished.

While some welcomed the erection of the obelisk, others questioned its use and practicality, and were sceptical of Simeon's motives in funding it. Some felt its design was inappropriate, and as early as September 1804 an anonymous correspondent to the Reading Mercury described it as "A spruce pedestal of Wedgwood Ware, where motley arms and tawdry emblems glare", and sarcastically referred to the monument as "the eighth wonder of the world". John Man, describing Market Place in his 1810 A Stranger in Reading, wrote that:

Although Man disliked the Simeon Monument, he was nonetheless an admirer of Soane, whom he described in the same book as "one of London's first architects ... whose numerous works, in the city [London], and other parts of the kingdom, are convincing proofs of his superior abilities, in a line which has yet to boast of very few masters".

The structure was never officially named, and since its erection has been referred to as the "Simeon Monument", "Soane Monument", "Simeon Obelisk" and "Soane Obelisk" interchangeably. As it was built to illuminate the market and divert the flow of traffic, rather than to officially commemorate any person or event, it is not strictly a monument; as it is a triangular rather than a square structure, it is not technically an obelisk; it was commissioned by Simeon and designed by Soane. Its listing on the National Heritage List for England describes it as the Simeon Monument, as does Soane's biographer Dorothy Stroud, while Adam Sowan's A Mark of Affection (2007) describes it as the "Soane Obelisk", on the grounds that "[Soane's] greater fame has no doubt saved it from demolition, and obelisk ... is what Simeon asked for".

Later developments

Edward Simeon died on 14 December 1812 in Highgate, "cut off prematurely with a peculiar and distressing malady". He left £4715 (about £ in  terms) to local causes in his will. The £1000 annuity at 3% which Edward Simeon had gifted in 1805 for the maintenance of the lamps proved more than was needed to keep the lighting operational following the conversion of the lamps to cheaper gas lighting in the 1840s and was unnecessary after the lamps were removed in 1911. In 1883 Simeon's bequest was transferred to the Official Trustee, with the dividends continuing to be used to pay for gas to the lamps. The surpluses were diverted to other local causes such as illuminating Market Place's clock.

In the mid 1840s, Neville's oil lamps were replaced by cheaper gas lamps, supported by heavier brackets; these in turn were replaced by tall lamp posts affixed to the ground rather than the monument itself in 1890. In 1911 the lamps were shut down and replaced with baskets of flowers. Although the original railings surrounding the structure had been an elaborate design of palmettes alternating with flame palmettes, by 1880 these had been replaced by railings of a more austere and functional design. By 1900 a cabmen's shelter had been constructed next to the monument, later used as a hut the attendants of a car park opened next to the obelisk to serve the market. Underground public toilets were installed adjacent to the obelisk in 1933.

Dilapidation and renovation

In 1956 the monument was Grade II listed. By this time, the structure was severely dilapidated, and described as "effectively ruined".  In 1965 responsibility for the monument was transferred to Reading Borough Council. In 1971 the baskets of flowers hanging from the disused lamp brackets were removed, and electric light bulbs in mock gas lamps installed, while in the mid-1970s the market itself was relocated across the town centre to Hosier Street, near its original site prior to its relocation to Market Place in the twelfth century. In 1981 the car park was closed, and in 1985 wheelchair-accessible toilets were erected next to the entrance to the underground toilets, clad in Portland stone to blend in with the Simeon Monument. By this time, the Monument was dilapidated and had survived demolition mainly through lobbying by admirers of Soane; a 2003 profile of the structure in the Daily Telegraph described this "strange, tripodal stalk of limestone" as "a rather clumsy bit of masonry, revered by Soane fans, ignored by everyone else".

Although Soane's designs had become unpopular in the late nineteenth and early twentieth centuries, and most of his buildings had been demolished or significantly altered, following his championing by Nikolaus Pevsner from the 1950s onwards attitudes began to slowly change. In 2005, following pressure from the Soane Monuments Trust, Reading Council agreed to landscape Market Place, removing the now-disused toilets and their airshaft and other structures surrounding the obelisk, and commissioning Julian Harrap to restore the monument itself. Following works costing a total of approximately £60,000 (£15,000 of which was provided by the Soane Monument Trust), the renovated monument was unveiled on 18 December 2007. By this time, the monument was the last surviving structure in Reading to have been designed by Soane.

Footnotes

References

Bibliography

External links

Grade II* listed buildings in Reading
Street lighting
Simeon family